Resul Tekeli (born September 16, 1986 in İstanbul) is a Turkish volleyball player. Since the 2011-12 season, he plays for Halkbank Ankara.

He started volleyball playing in the junior's team of Fenerbahçe, and was loaned out to Arçelik in the 2006-07 season. The next season, he returned to his main and wore the jersey number 5. In the 2008-09 season, he  transferred to Ziraat Bankası before he signed for Halkbank Ankara in 2011. He is a regular member of the Turkey men's national volleyball team.

Tekeli became runner-up with Ziraatbankası at the 2009-10 Turkish Men's Volleyball League and was honored with "Payidar Demir Award". He won the Men's CEV Cup 2012–13 with Halkbank Ankara and was named "Best Blocker" of the tournament.

Sporting achievements

Clubs

CEV Cup
   2012/2013 – with Halkbank Ankara

National championships
 2009/2010  Turkish Championship, with Ziraat Bankası Ankara
 2015/2016  Turkish SuperCup 2015, with Halkbank Ankara
 2015/2016  Turkish Championship, with Halkbank Ankara

References

External links
 Player profile at fenerbahce.org

1986 births
Living people
Volleyball players from Istanbul
Turkish men's volleyball players
Fenerbahçe volleyballers
Halkbank volleyball players
Arçelik volleyballers
Ziraat Bankası volleyball players
21st-century Turkish people